Jean-Baptiste Bienvenu Martin (22 July 1847 – 10 December 1943) was a French Radical leader and cabinet officer.  He was born at Saint-Bris-le-Vineux (Yonne), and was educated in the law.

Career 
He held an under prefecture, entered the Council of State, and in 1894 became director under the Minister of the Colonies.  He was an unsuccessful senatorial candidate for Yonne in 1897, was elected deputy for Auxerre in that year, was reelected in 1898 and 1902, and in 1905 became Senator for Yonne.  In the Chamber he supported the Waldeck-Rousseau and the Combes ministries, and advocated the separation of church and state.

In 1904 he organized the new Radical group of the Left.  In 1905-06 he held the portfolio of Public Instruction in the Rouvier cabinet; he was Minister of Justice in the Doumergue cabinet in 1913–14, and in the first  cabinet organized by René Viviani in June, 1914; and when the War in Europe broke out in 1914, he became Minister of Labor in the second Viviani cabinet, formed August 26 of that year.

He died on December 10, 1943 at Saint-Bris.

External links
 Institut National de Recherche Pédagogique biography (French)

Notes 
 

1847 births
1943 deaths
People from Yonne
Politicians from Bourgogne-Franche-Comté
Radical Party (France) politicians
Government ministers of France
Members of the 6th Chamber of Deputies of the French Third Republic
Members of the 7th Chamber of Deputies of the French Third Republic
Members of the 8th Chamber of Deputies of the French Third Republic
French Senators of the Third Republic
Senators of Yonne